Padre Manuel Arruda da Câmara (Pombal 1752–Goiana, October 2, 1810) was a Brazilian cleric, physician and scientist, who became known as one of the great Brazilian botanists of the late eighteenth century.

Life
His parents, Francisco Arruda da Câmara and Maria Saraiva da Silva, were New Christians, (Cristão-novo) Jews who were forced to convert to Christianity in the Spanish and Portuguese lands by the Inquisition. Born in the hinterland of Paraiba State, his father was a farmer. He was initially educated in Goiana, Pernambuco and on November 23, 1783 he took orders at the Carmelitas Calçados monastery of  Calçados in Goiana, Pernambuco State, adopting the name Frei Manuel do Coração de Jesus. Following this, he and his brother Francisco travelled to Europe to further their studies. He attended the University of Coimbra in 1786, where he graduated in Natural Philosophy, and then after moving to Montpellier, France, in 1790 he received his doctorate in medicine from the University of Montpellier.

While in France he had come in contact with the ideas of Voltaire and Rousseau, and the spirit of the French Revolution. Back in Brazil he became keenly aware of social injustice in his own society. He was also a Freemason and founded the Areopagus Lodge (Areópago de Itambé), a liberal philosophical society which attracted a number of local intellectuals and was involved in the Conspiracy of Suaçunas in 1801. This was one of the early attempts to liberate Brazil from Portuguese colonial rule in Brazil (Movimentos Emancipacionistas). The lodge was closed down by the authorities in 1802, and da Câmara would not see independence achieved in his lifetime. In 1805 he relinquished his vows.

Career 
On returning to Brazil in 1793 he became established in Goiana and undertook a series of mineralogical, botanical and zoological expeditions for the Portuguese Crown in the North east from 1794–1800. Between March 1794 and September 1795 he explored Pernambuco and Piauí for minerals, Paraíba and Ceará from December 1797 to July 1799, and was in Maranhão from 1799 to 1800. He also explored the basin of the São Francisco River.

Work 
He wrote extensively on the agriculture and natural history of the region, often with a philosophical perspective and a desire for improvement. In some of his work he collaborated with a fellow priest, Padre João Ribeiro Pessoa de Mello Montenegro and they provided illustrations for works such as Centúrias dos novos gêneros e espécies das plantas pernambucanas.

In 1810 he produced two pamphlets, the Dissertação sobre as plantas do Brazil, a discussion of Brazilian plants suitable for replacing hemp, and Discurso sobre a vitalidade da instituição de jardins on the suitability of establishing gardens in Brazil. His intention had been to compile an illustrated flora of Pernambuco, his Centúrias, but it remained unfinished at his death and was never published. In all. he described 31 new species. He was visited by Henry Koster, the American explorer, in 1810 during the latter's travels in Brazil, and who was later to incorporate some of Arruda's work into his own book of that name, published in 1816.

Publications 
  Physiologico-chemicae, de influentia oxigenii in oeeconomia animali, precipe in calore, et calore hominum. Joannem Martel natu majorem, Regis Universitatisque Typographum consuetum, Montpellier. 1791. (Doctoral dissertation)
 Aviso aos lavradores sobre a suposta fermentação de qualquer qualidade de grãos ou pevides para aumento da colheita, A. Rodrigues Galhardo, Lisbon, 1792.
 Anúncio dos descobrimentos feitos em Paranambuco e remetido a um dos editors. Paládio Portugués ou Clarim de Palas do mês de maio de 1796 1(2): 4–13.
 
 
 Discurso sobre a uitalidade da instituição de jardins nas principais províncias do brasil, Impressão Régia, Rio de Janeiro 1810.
 Memórias sobre o algodão de Pernambuco, Lisbon, 1810. 
 Memórias sobre as plantas de que se podem fazer a barrilha entre nós, Memórias da Academia Real das Ciências de Lisboa, v.4: 83–93, 1814. 
 Tratado de Agricultura. 
 Tratado da lógica.
  A almêcega e a carnaúba. Diário de Pernambuco, “Revista Diária”, Recife. (Posthumous 28 Nov 1886).
 Centúrias dos novos gêneros e espécies das plantas pernambucanas (unfinished; Centuria plantarum pernambucensium -Cent. plant. Pern.)

Legacy 
The genus Arrudea Cambess. (Clusiaceae) is named in his honour. In his home state of Paraíba, the Zoological and Botanical gardens (Parque Zoobotânico Arruda Câmara) in João Pessoa, the capital city, bear his name. Also a chair in the Academia Paraibana de Letras is named after him.

Arruda da Câmara's botanical contributions have not been well served by history, for instance the multiple inaccuracies in the Index Kewensis. Henry Koster incorporated parts of the Dissertação and the Discurso in translation into his Travels in Brazil, as an appendix. While Koster's work was largely read, reprinted and translated, Arruda da Câmara's work was largely unknown, and consequently Arruda da Câmara's discoveries were incorrectly attributed to Koster. Taxa are correctly referred to as "Arruda Cent. plant. Pern." In 1873 a botanical dictionary appeared based on da Câmara's manuscripts.

See also 
 Areopagus lodge
 Conspiracy of Suaçunas
 Henry Koster

References

Bibliography

Historical sources 
 
 
 

19th-century Brazilian botanists
1752 births
1810 deaths
Brazilian Freemasons
Brazilian people of Portuguese-Jewish descent
People from Paraíba
18th-century Brazilian botanists